Andrea is a given name common in many parts of the world.

Andrea may also refer to:

Weather
Subtropical Storm Andrea (2007), the first named storm of the 2007 Atlantic hurricane season
Tropical Storm Andrea (2013), the first named storm of the 2013 Atlantic hurricane season

Ships
SS Andrea, an Italian cargo ship  
SS Andrea Doria, an Italian ocean liner which capsized and sank on 25 July 1956

Media

Albums
Andrea (Andrea Bocelli album), 2004
Andrea (The Sunrays album) or the title song (see below), 1966

Songs
"Andrea" (song), by the Sunrays, 1966
"Andrea", by Fabrizio De André from Rimini, 1978
"Andrea", by Toronto from Greatest Hits, 1984
"Andrea", by Bad Bunny and Buscabulla from Un Verano Sin Ti, 2022

Other media
Andrea (film), a 1973 Argentine musical comedy film
Andrea (The Spanish Tragedy), a character in Thomas Kyd's play The Spanich Tragedy
Andrea (The Walking Dead), a character in the comic book and television series The Walking Dead
Andrea Chénier, colloquially Andrea, an 1896 opera by Umberto Giordano
Andrea, a character in the animated family comedy film Chibi Maruko-chan: A Boy From Italy
Andrea (Bulgarian singer), or her eponymous 2010 album

Other uses
 Project Andrea, an effort by the Chilean military dictatorship to manufacture sarin gas

See also

Andria (disambiguation)